State Road 708 (SR 708) is a , east–west thoroughfare in Riviera Beach locally known as Blue Heron Boulevard. The road extends from an intersection with Bee-Line Highway (State Road 710) to an intersection with Broadway (U.S. Route 1 (US 1).

Route description
State Road 708 begins as Blue Heron Boulevard at an intersection with Bee Line Highway at the southern end of the VA Hospital. The road heads east towards its first stoplight at Military Trail (SR 809), with a mix of residential and commercial areas for the half mile between Military Trail and the interchange with Interstate 95 (I-95). East of I-95, SR 708 passes through a few businesses, before crossing a canal, and then becomes almost exclusively residential with some commercial mixed in for the rest of the route. It jogs slightly to the south before intersecting Congress Avenue, and continues east, passing by a local park, and industrial areas on the south side of SR 708. Blue Heron Boulevard then jogs to the north just prior to meeting Old Dixie Highway (CR 811), and heads east through a dense residential area before terminating at US 1.

Blue Heron Boulevard continues as SR A1A eastward from US 1, crossing Lake Worth on the Riviera Beach Bridge to serve the beach just north of Palm Beach Shores.

Major intersections

References

External links

708
708